Edward Watson Short, Baron Glenamara,  (17 December 1912 – 4 May 2012) was a British Labour Party politician and deputy leader of the Labour Party. He was Member of Parliament (MP) for Newcastle upon Tyne Central and served as a minister during the Labour governments under Harold Wilson, before being appointed to the House of Lords shortly after James Callaghan became Prime Minister.

Following the death of James Allason on 16 June 2011, Short was the oldest living former member of the British House of Commons. He died just under a year later, aged 99. At the time of his death he was the oldest member of the House of Lords.

Early career
Short was born in Warcop, Westmorland. His father Charles Short, a draper, was married to Mary. Short qualified as a teacher at College of the Venerable Bede, Durham University, before completing a second degree, in law, at London University. He taught on Tyneside until enlisting in 1939. He served as a Captain in the Durham Light Infantry of the British Army during the Second World War. After leaving the army, he returned to teaching, becoming Newcastle branch secretary of the National Union of Teachers and in 1947, head of Princess Louise Boys' School, Blyth.

Having joined the Labour Party in 1942, Short was elected a councillor on Newcastle City Council in 1948, where he led the Labour Group within two years. He was first elected to Parliament for Newcastle upon Tyne Central at the 1951 general election. He was appointed to the Privy Council in 1964, and was made a Companion of Honour in 1976.

Postmaster General
Short was responsible for the outlawing of pirate radio stations such as Radio Caroline. Following the government campaign against the pirates previously led by Tony Benn, his predecessor in the post of Postmaster-General (then the minister with responsibility for broadcasting), Short was responsible for introducing the bill which became the Marine, &c., Broadcasting (Offences) Act 1967. In a 1982 interview for BBC Radio's The Story of Pop Radio, Short admitted having enjoyed listening to some of those stations, particularly Radio 390.

As Postmaster General, Short ordered the creation of the 1966 England Winners stamp to celebrate England's victory in the 1966 FIFA World Cup.

Education Secretary
He subsequently served as Education Secretary 1968–70, and became Labour's deputy leader on 25 April 1972 after Roy Jenkins resigned over differences on European policy. Short was seen at the time as a "safe pair of hands". His main rival for the job was the left-winger Michael Foot who was viewed by many on the centre and right of the party as a divisive figure. Short defeated Foot and Anthony Crosland in the same vote.

Lord President of the Council
Short's new seniority was reflected in his appointment as Lord President of the Council – though not Deputy Prime Minister – 1974–76, but he did not have the stature to mount a leadership bid himself on Wilson's retirement. He was not offered a Cabinet post on James Callaghan's election as Prime Minister. His resignation letter said that the time had come for him to step aside for a younger man; this was sarcasm, as he was replaced by Michael Foot, who was only seven months younger than himself. Short was also nine months younger than Callaghan, who had dropped him from the cabinet.

Peerage
He was made a life peer as Baron Glenamara, of Glenridding in the County of Cumbria on 28 January 1977, a few months after he had left the Commons. One year before, he was appointed Chairman of Cable and Wireless Ltd, which was at the time a nationalised industry. He served in that post until 1980.

As a life peer he was a member of the House of Lords, although he stopped attending regularly a few years before his death.

His name lives on in the House of Commons with the term "Short Money". This refers to funds paid by the Government to help run the Parliamentary office of the Leader of the Opposition. The then Mr Short pioneered this idea during his time in the House.

He was made a Freeman of the City of Newcastle in 2001 "in recognition of his eminent and outstanding public service" and served as Chancellor of the University of Northumbria, a post he retired from in 2005.

References 

 
 
 Debrett's People of Today 2006
 Who's Who 2006
 Times Guide to the House of Commons October 1974

External links 
 

|-

|-

|-

|-

|-

|-

|-

|-

1912 births
2012 deaths
Alumni of the College of the Venerable Bede, Durham
British Secretaries of State for Education
Councillors in Tyne and Wear
Durham Light Infantry officers
Labour Party (UK) MPs for English constituencies
Labour Party (UK) life peers
Leaders of the House of Commons of the United Kingdom
Lord Presidents of the Council
Members of the Order of the Companions of Honour
Members of the Privy Council of the United Kingdom
Ministers in the Wilson governments, 1964–1970
National Union of Teachers-sponsored MPs
People associated with Northumbria University
People from Warcop
Schoolteachers from Cumbria
UK MPs 1951–1955
UK MPs 1955–1959
UK MPs 1959–1964
UK MPs 1964–1966
UK MPs 1966–1970
UK MPs 1970–1974
UK MPs 1974
UK MPs 1974–1979
UK MPs who were granted peerages
United Kingdom Postmasters General
Life peers created by Elizabeth II